Lindsay Grant-Stuart (born 28 September 1947) is a Zimbabwean diver. She competed in the women's 3 metre springboard event at the 1964 Summer Olympics.

References

1947 births
Living people
Zimbabwean female divers
Olympic divers of Rhodesia
Divers at the 1964 Summer Olympics
Place of birth missing (living people)